Gail Patrick (born Margaret LaVelle Fitzpatrick; June 20, 1911 – July 6, 1980) was an American film actress and television producer. Often cast as the bad girl or the other woman, she appeared in more than 60 feature films between 1932 and 1948, notably My Man Godfrey (1936), Stage Door (1937), and My Favorite Wife (1940).

After retiring from acting, she became, as Gail Patrick Jackson, president of Paisano Productions and executive producer of the Perry Mason television series (1957–1966). She was one of the first female producers, and the only female executive producer in prime time during the nine years Perry Mason was on the air. She served two terms (1960–1962) as vice president of the National Academy of Television Arts and Sciences and as president of its Hollywood chapter—the first woman to serve in a leadership capacity in the academy, and its only female leader until 1983.

Early life

Gail Patrick was born Margaret LaVelle Fitzpatrick on June 20, 1911, in Birmingham, Alabama. Her parents were Lawrence C. Fitzpatrick Sr., a municipal fireman, and Margaret Lavelle Fitzpatrick. She had an elder brother, Lawrence Jr., and possibly other siblings.

Career
After graduating from Howard College, she remained as acting dean of women. She completed two years of law school at the University of Alabama and aspired to be the state's governor. In 1932, "for a lark", she entered a Paramount Pictures beauty and talent contest, and won train fare to Hollywood for herself and her brother. Although she did not win the contest (for "Miss Panther Woman" in Island of Lost Souls starring Charles Laughton and Bela Lugosi, 1932), Patrick was offered a standard contract. 

She visited the studio officials by herself and asked to negotiate. She said that she must have $75 a week instead of the customary $50, and that she would not accept the standard 12-week-layoff provision. "I also read the fine print and blacked out the clause saying I had to do cheesecake stills," Patrick recalled in a 1979 interview. "In the back of my mind I had this idea I could never go home to practice law if such stills were floating around."

Her patrician bearing and luminous beauty helped her win top billing occasionally, as in King of Alcatraz (1938) and Disbarred (1939), both directed by Robert Florey—but she most often played the cool, aloof, usually unsympathetic "other woman". She appeared in more than 60 movies between 1932 and 1948, usually as the leading lady's extremely formidable rival. Some of these roles include Carole Lombard's spoiled sister in My Man Godfrey (1936), Ginger Rogers's rival in Stage Door (1937), and Anna May Wong's sophisticated competitor in Dangerous to Know (1938). Patrick played Cary Grant's second wife in My Favorite Wife (1940), with Irene Dunne, and helped Leo McCarey write the judge's lines in the second courtroom scene.

Praising her perfect combination of haughtiness and malice, as well as her comic gifts and refusal to play for sympathy, film scholar Maria DiBattista called her "the underrated Gail Patrick, who excelled in feckless or selfish or simply second-best brunettes."

Patrick attributed her screen success to an accident of timing. When she arrived in Hollywood, the movie studios then wanted hussies, and they felt she looked like one. "I never thought I had much to do with it", Patrick recalled. "Somebody made me up, somebody did my hair, somebody told me what to say and do, and somebody took the picture."

Patrick was so afraid of the camera that she made it a point to never see her films. In 1979, she screened a print of My Man Godfrey given to her by a friend, and she watched herself on screen for the first time. "My fright emerged as haughtiness and I can see where I got my image as a snob, a meanie," Patrick said. "And it's the movie that typed me and the one I'm still asked about." She said director Gregory La Cava told her she should suck on lemons and beat up little children to prepare for the role of Cornelia Bullock. La Cava borrowed Patrick from Paramount again for his next film, Stage Door—"where I was never nastier".

Later career
Patrick stopped acting in 1948. "I never formally retired", she told journalist James Bawden in 1979. "I just quit, and it was a good time as TV started taking over." 

During the summer of 1951, Patrick hosted Home Plate, a postgame interview show at Gilmore Field that immediately followed television broadcasts of the Hollywood Stars home games on KTTV. She and her third husband, Cornwell Jackson, adopted a daughter in 1952, and a son in 1954.

Cornwell Jackson was literary agent for attorney-author Erle Stanley Gardner, creator of the fictional criminal defense attorney Perry Mason. After a series of disappointing Warner Bros. films and a radio series he despised, Gardner had refused to license the character for any more adaptations, but Patrick won the author's trust. She had maintained her network in show business, and shared Gardner's love for the law. Patrick, Jackson, and Gardner formed a production company, Paisano Productions, of which she was president. Patrick developed the television series Perry Mason and sold it to CBS, where it ran for nine seasons (1957–66) and earned the first Silver Gavel Award presented for television drama by the American Bar Association. Gail Patrick Jackson was its executive producer. She was one of the first women producers.

Longtime CBS executive Anne Nelson, who handled contract negotiation and other business affairs for CBS, called Patrick "my adversary in business, but my friend in life." In a 2008 interview, Nelson reported that Patrick was the only female executive producer in prime time during the years Perry Mason was on the air. "Women today won't believe that things were that tough," Nelson said, "but Gail was alone in her bailiwick, and I was the only female executive not in personnel at CBS at the time." Nelson said that years later, Patrick told her she had written up the contract herself, and that it was so wild and favorable to Paisano Productions that she had no idea CBS would accept it. "But we bought it," Nelson said. "And it has been a very big financial success, not only for CBS, but [also] for the Paisano partners over this many years."

Patrick also developed a half-hour Paisano Productions series based on Gardner's Cool and Lam stories. A pilot directed by Jacques Tourneur aired on CBS in 1958, but a series did not materialize.

Patrick served two terms (1960–62) as vice president of the National Academy of Television Arts and Sciences and as president of its Hollywood chapter. She was the first woman to serve in a leadership capacity in the academy, and its only female leader until 1983.

Personal life
Patrick was a Democrat who supported the campaign of Adlai Stevenson during the 1952 presidential election.

Her home, a gated estate of nearly seven acres on La Brea Terrace in Los Angeles, was occasionally a shooting location for Perry Mason, beginning with the third season. The mansion was built in 1911 for Dustin Farnum. Patrick purchased it from the estate of writer-producer Mark Hellinger after his death in December 1947.

Marriages and children

On December 17, 1936, Patrick married restaurateur Robert H. Cobb, owner of the Brown Derby and principal owner of the Hollywood Stars baseball team. An ardent baseball fan, she was called "Ma Patrick" and threw out the ceremonial first pitch at the team's new Gilmore Field on May 2, 1939. To Hollywood's surprise, the Cobbs separated in October 1940 and were divorced in November 1941.

Patrick's patriotic service during World War II included four tours of Canada promoting Victory Loans, making her the only film star to visit the entire nation from coast to coast. On her return from a war bond tour, she met Lieutenant Arnold Dean White, a pilot in the U.S. Navy Naval Air Transport Service; they married on July 11, 1944. In June 1945, she gave premature birth to twins who soon died. She became diabetic and had to take insulin the rest of her life.  She and White divorced in March 1946.

In July 1947, Patrick married her third husband, Thomas Cornwell Jackson, head of the Los Angeles office of the J. Walter Thompson advertising agency. She created a business out of her home, designing clothing for children, and moved to a shop on Rodeo Drive that she called the Enchanted Cottage. Patrick ran the shop for eight years with considerable success. A 1947 short film, part of the Paramount Pictures Unusual Occupations series, includes scenes of Patrick with patrons including Maureen O'Sullivan.

Patrick divorced Jackson in 1969. They remained partners in Paisano Productions, together with Gardner's widow, daughter, and sister-in-law. When Jackson proposed reviving Perry Mason for CBS, the Paisano partners voted with him despite Patrick's opposition. She was given the title of executive consultant for the resulting series, The New Perry Mason (1973–74). "My name was on it," said Patrick, "but I wanted nothing to do with it. Corney was on his own." A failure with critics and in the Nielsen ratings, the series ran only fifteen episodes.

In 1974, she married her fourth husband, John E. Velde, Jr.; they were married until her death.

Death
On July 6, 1980, Patrick died from leukemia at the age of 69 at her Hollywood home of more than thirty years. She had been treated for the disease for four years, but kept her illness secret from everyone but her husband. She was cremated and her ashes scattered at sea off Santa Monica, California, in a private ceremony.

Awards, honors, and memorials
Patrick was twice named Los Angeles Woman of the Year by the Los Angeles Times, and she received awards from the National Association of Women Lawyers and the City of Hope National Medical Center.

In 1955, Patrick returned to Howard College (now Samford University), her alma mater, for the laying of the cornerstone of its new Edgewood campus. She was presented with a citation for outstanding achievement, "in recognition of achievements in the arts, in service to her fellow man, and devotion to home and family". Samford University presents the Gail Patrick Directing Award in her honor.

In 1960, Patrick received the Mystery Writers of America's Raven Award for her contributions to the mystery genre as executive producer of Perry Mason.

In 1962, Patrick was named the Delta Zeta Woman of the Year. A member of the sorority at Howard College, Patrick was vice president of the first board of directors of the Delta Zeta Foundation. A $1 million bequest from the Gail Patrick Velde Trust established the sorority's Gail Patrick Women of Distinction Program, which provides undergraduate and graduate scholarships and the honorarium awarded to Delta Zeta alumnae designated as woman of the year, the organization's highest honor.

In 1970, Patrick was appointed national honorary chairman of the American Lung Association's  Christmas Seals campaign. She accepted the post as "a meaningful way" to pay tribute to her Perry Mason colleagues who died of respiratory disease associated with tobacco smoking: Ray Collins, who died of emphysema; William Talman, who publicly blamed cigarettes for his lung cancer; and William Hopper, who died from pneumonia following a stroke. "I have a personal share in the untimely loss of my co-workers, for they were my friends, too," Patrick said.

In 1973, Patrick became the first national chairman of the American Diabetes Association board of directors. The Gail Patrick Innovation Award is presented by the organization in her honor, to advance research toward the prevention, treatment, and cure of diabetes.

The Gail Patrick Stage is a film soundstage that opened in 2008 at Columbia College Hollywood. Patrick was a member of the film school's board of trustees and funded the facility through her estate.

Filmography

Radio credits

References

External links

 
 Photographs of Gail Patrick

1911 births
1980 deaths
American film actresses
American television producers
American women television producers
Deaths from leukemia
Actresses from Birmingham, Alabama
Deaths from cancer in California
20th-century American actresses
Perry Mason
Articles containing video clips
Alabama Democrats
California Democrats